Désandans is a commune in the Doubs department in the Bourgogne-Franche-Comté region in eastern France.

Population

Notable natives
 André Parrot (1901–1980), archaeologist

See also
 Communes of the Doubs department

References

Communes of Doubs
County of Montbéliard